Time to Say Goodbye? is a 1997 American made-for-television drama film directed by David Jones and starring Eva Marie Saint. The film is centered on the decision of an elderly family patriarch to end his life, when faced with the degradation of Alzheimer's disease. The film originally premiered on Lifetime cable network on September 1, 1997.

Cast
 Eva Marie Saint ...  Ruth Klooster
 Richard Kiley ...  Dr. Gerald Klooster
 Margaret Colin ...  Kristen Hamstra
 Rick Roberts ...  Chip Klooster
 Alex Carter ...  Craig Klooster
 Kevin Hicks ...  Curt Klooster
 John Neville ...  Michigan Judge
 Elizabeth Shepherd ...  Teresa Rodriguez
 Louis Di Bianco ...  Joe Rodriguez
 Greg Ellwand ...  Bill
 Tracey Hoyt ...  Mary
 Catherine McNally ...  Betty
 Max Naiman ...  Zachery
 Connor Cunningham ...  Alexander
 John Boylan ...  Dr. Peters
 Richard McMillan ...  Dr. Fawcett
 John Innes ...  Stroup
 Martin Doyle ...  Earhart
 David Eisner ...  Justis
 Thomas Hauff ...  Judge McKinistry
 Philip Akin ...  Airport Police Officer
 Ronn Sarosiak ...  Florida Patrolman
 Matthew Bennett ...  FBI Officer
 James Downing ...  Tony
 Harry Hamlin

References

External links

 

1997 television films
1997 films
1997 drama films
American drama television films
Films about suicide
Lifetime (TV network) films
Films directed by David Jones
1990s American films
1990s English-language films